Vision IPTV is a niche internet TV and IPTV company located in London. The business offers a white label, broadcast standard, over the top internet TV platform service, based on the server technology developed by sister company Playout247, who  provides satellite playout services which deliver channels to SKY and other satellite operators. Vision IPTV is based in central London. In February 2011, Vision IPTV opened an office in Dubai. The company has a corporate responsibility program and supports several charities, including Human Being Best.

Vision provides the equipment and services required to receive, ingest, transcode, edit, store, manage and play out to the internet. Vision also owns its own content delivery network CDN.

The company provides the following services:

– Scheduled broadcast Playout  direct from  studio or recorded material

– Satellite turnaround

– Digital rights management  to secure the security of broadcast content

– VOD, or catch up TV Catch-up, Forward TV and on-demand viewing

– Simulcast or linear broadcast channels

– File download and Streaming distribution

– Ingest and File Encoding
 
– Ad network integration and pre, mid and post-roll Advertising automation

– Financial, Pay per view and user Monitoring and analytics

– Broadcast delivery to PCs, hand-held devices, next generation TV and ADSL connected set-top boxes

IPTV Platform 

In October 2010 the company launched its IPTV platform  at MIPCOM.

The platform has the following features:

Content delivery in the following protocols and codecs:

– HTTP WMV Silverlight

– RTSP WMV Silverlight

– HTTP MP4 Pseudo Streaming (Apple, Adobe, MS Smooth Streaming and ExtremeHTTP versions)

– RTMP MP4 Flash

– HTTP MP4 and WMV Progressive Download

Flash and Silverlight player with support for Internet Explorer, Firefox, Opera and Safari browsers

Media library provides:

– MRSS metadata implementation expanded with extra tags to accommodate traditional broadcast requirements

– Broadcast  playlists with mark-in/out

– EPG RSS feeds

– Media library update RSS feeds

– Per item pricing and security

– Each media asset can have MP4 and WMV files (or multibitrate live streams), each in four bitrates

Content Security:

– Whitelisting (referrer authorisation)

– Session ID (registration status, wallet balance, content rights)

– HMAC DRM (private key or public key)

– Geo IP (DVD regions and individual countries are supported)

Subscriber/User Registration System:-

– Registration without email confirmation

– Registration via email confirmation

– Front end user profile edit

– Front end user transaction statements

Payment options:

– Support for multiple gateways: 
  
 WorldPay
 Click and Buy
 Cash U (scratch card cash payments)
 PayPal

– Support for multiple billing schemas:

 PPV (per item billing)
 PPV per second billing (pay as you go)
 Recurring monthly subscription
 Prepaid subscription (1 day, 3 days, Week, Month, 3 months)

Reporting:

 Bandwidth/transit reports
 Streaming reports
 Revenue reports
 Web stats reports

History

Incorporated in 2006,
 Vision IPTV was founded by John Mills and Matt Vidmar. John Mills was formerly the Commercial Director at IPTV operator, Homechoice, now branded TalkTalk TV.

The company is part of a group of companies, Vision Holding, that comprises Vision IPTV, Playout247 and Soho Data. The Company is privately owned.

In September 2010, Vision IPTV and sister company Playout247 reported revenue growth of 40% and a major investment programme. The investment was reported to cover a doubling in satellite playout capacity and increased demand for their Internet TV services. Later in the same month Vision IPTV launched their IPTV platform at MIPCOM in France. The company shortly thereafter announced it has won the Renault TV account with Publicis Media.

In late October, Vision IPTV announced the launch of Racing UK on IPTV. The solution enables Racing UK to offer their channel to non SKY subscribers via a set top box.

In early 2011, following the announcement of plans by the UK Culture Secretary for the establishment of a local TV channel, Vision IPTV called on the UK Culture Secretary to have the new channel distributed via broadband Internet rather than the digital terrestrial TV network as the lower distribution costs would make it easier for local broadcasters to participate.

At the end of January 2011, Vision IPTV expanded its operation into the UAE with the announcement that it was opening an office in Dubai, and this was to be launched at CABSAT MENA in February 2011.

Customers

Customers include Russia Today, Publicis Media, Racing UK, and VX TV.

Press

 12 April 2010, Darim UK, a joint venture between innovative IPTV company Vision IPTV and broadcast technology experts Darim, will showcase the most advanced, flexible and innovative portable 3D studio webcasting and video on demand available on the market.
 16 September 2010 (Close-Up Media via COMTEX) – Playout247 and Vision IPTV, both sister companies of one another, announced the beginning of a major investment program in studio and broadcast technology supported by capacity increases.
 4–8 October 2010: Vision IPTV’s fully featured Internet TV platform will be launched at MIPCOM 2010 (Cannes, France) 

 10 January 2011. Soho Data Holdings, sister company to Vision IPTV and Playout247, today signed a £10m agreement with Xiking Culture Media (Beijing), to establish a data centre and render farm, aimed at the creative video and TV industries.
 20 January 2011. Vision IPTV has called on Culture Secretary Jeremy Hunt to back broadcast quality Internet-only distribution and playout for the new national TV channel.
 31 January 2011.At CABSAT MENA 2011, leading internet TV company, Vision IPTV will launch a commercial and technical hub in Dubai, UAE, to support customer expansion throughout the Middle East, West Asia and Africa regions.

References

External links 
 Vision IPTV website

Internet broadcasting